Nebojša Joksimović (born November 17, 1981) is a Slovenian professional basketball player for Sixt Primorska of the Slovenian League.

Professional career
In August 2013, he signed a one-year deal with Union Olimpija. In July 2014, he signed with another Slovenian team BC Krka. After playing one season for Krka, in October 2015 he moved to the Croatian side Cibona.

In July 2017, he signed with Sixt Primorska.

Slovenian national team
Joksimović played for the Slovenian national team at the 2005 FIBA European Championship, Olympic Qualifying Tournament 2008 and 2013 FIBA European Championship. He also represented Slovenia at the 2015 EuroBasket where they were eliminated by Latvia in eighth finals.

Personal life
Joksimović has Serb ancestry, and holds Serbian citizenship besides his native Slovenian.

References

External links

 Nebojša Joksimović at aba-liga.com
 Nebojša Joksimović at legabasket.it
 Nebojša Joksimović at euroleague.net

1981 births
Living people
ABA League players
KK Hemofarm players
KK Igokea players
KK Olimpija players
PBC Lokomotiv-Kuban players
KK Cibona players
Sportspeople from Koper
Shooting guards
Slovenian men's basketball players
Slovenian people of Serbian descent
Victoria Libertas Pallacanestro players
KK Krka players
Slovenian expatriate basketball people in Serbia
Slovenian expatriate basketball people in Russia
Slovenian expatriate basketball people in Italy
Slovenian expatriate basketball people in Croatia